Klocwork is a static code analysis tool owned by Minneapolis, Minnesota-based software developer Perforce. Klocwork software analyzes source code in real time, simplifies peer code reviews, and extends the life of complex software.

Overview
Klocwork is used to identify security, safety and reliability issues in C, C++, C#, Java, JavaScript and Python code. The product includes numerous desktop plug-ins for developers, metrics and reporting.

History
Originally Klocwork’s technology was developed to address requirements for large-scale source code analysis to optimize software architecture for C code inside Nortel Networks and spun out in 2001. 

In January 2012, Klocwork Insight 9.5 was released. It provided on-the-fly static analysis in Visual Studio, like a word processor does with spelling mistakes.

In May 2013, Klocwork Cahoots peer code review tool was launched.

Awards and recognition
In 2007, Klocwork was awarded the 2007 InfoWorld Technology of Year award for best source code analyzer.

In May 2014, Klocwork won the Red Herring Top 100 North America Award, in the software sector.

Original developer

Klocwork was an Ottawa, Canada-based software company that developed the Klocwork brand of programming tools for software developers. The company was acquired by Minneapolis-based application software developer Perforce in 2019, as part of their acquisition of Klocwork's parent software company Rogue Wave. Klocwork no longer exists as a standalone company, but Perforce continues to develop Klocwork branded static code analysis software.

Company history
The company was founded in 2001 as a spin-out of Nortel Networks. Its initial investors were Firstmark Capital, USVP, and Mobius Ventures.

In January 2014, the company was acquired by Rogue Wave Software.

In January 2019, Rogue Wave was acquired by Minneapolis-based application software developer Perforce.

References

External links

Static program analysis tools
Development software companies
Software companies established in 2001
2014 mergers and acquisitions